Jessie Maple is an American cinematographer and film director most noted as a pioneer for the civil rights of African-Americans and women in the film industry.  Her 1981 film Will was one of the first feature-length dramatic films created by an African-American woman."

Early life and education
Maple was born in Louisiana in 1947 in a family of 4 brothers and seven sisters. In the 1960s and 1970s, Maple was head of a bacteriology and serology laboratory in Philadelphia and New York. She later wrote for the New York Courier. She received film training through Ossie Davis's Third World Cinema, and through the National Education Television Training School, a program run by WNET public television in New York City. The latter program was established for African Americans to learn behind-the-scenes camera jobs in order to get into the union, but funding for this program was short-lived; as Maple noted, "It was so successful that after one year they shut it down." She began her career in film as an apprentice editor for Shaft's Big Score! and The Super Cops. After being admitted to the Film Editor's Union, Maple studied and passed the examination for the Cinematographer's Union.

Career
Following a prolonged legal struggle in 1973, Maple became the first African-American woman admitted to the New York camera operators union. She described her lawsuits and struggle in a self-published autobiographical book, How to Become a Union Camerawoman (1976). In a 2020 interview, she said, "After I passed the test and got into the cameraman’s union, then they told the studios not to hire me and blacklisted me. I decided, well, I’m going to fight this....I decided, let me get this out the way, I sued them all at once, ABC, CBS, NBC, and I won."

Working for many years as a news camerawoman, Maple recounts she had her best moment when she realized she could "edit the story in the camera and prevent the editor from taking a positive story and making a negative one out of it," particularly in stories with a race element where black people were often left out of the news story.  According to Maple, "I would shoot [the story] in a way where they couldn't cut the black person out of [it]. They had to see both sides of what happened and what they had to say." In 1974 Maple cofounded LJ Films Productions with her husband, Leroy Patton, to produce short documentaries.

In 1981, Maple released the independent feature film Will, a gritty drama about a girls' basketball coach struggling with heroin addiction. With that release, Maple has been cited as the first African-American woman to direct an independent feature-length film in the post-civil rights era. In order to show her own film, and other independent movies by African-Americans, Maple and Patton opened the 20 West Theater, Home of Black Cinema in their Harlem brownstone home in 1982. Her second independent feature film was Twice as Nice from a screenplay by poet and actress Saundra Pearl Sharp. Released in 1989, the film is a tale of twin sisters who play basketball.

The Black Film Center/Archive at Indiana University holds the papers and films of Maple in the Jessie Maple Collection, 1971–1992.

Selected filmography

Features
 Will (1981)
 Twice as Nice (1989)

Documentaries
 Methadone: Wonder Drug or Evil Spirit (1976)
 Black Economic Power: Reality or Fantasy (1977)

Books
 How to Become a Union Camerawoman: Film-Videotape, New York, L. J. Film Productions, 1977

References

External links

Living people
American film directors
American women film directors
African-American film directors
American cinematographers
African-American cinematographers
American women cinematographers
Activists for African-American civil rights
Year of birth missing (living people)
21st-century African-American people
21st-century African-American women